Mayumi Kawasaki (born 1 October 1972) is a Japanese basketball player. She competed in the women's tournament at the 1996 Summer Olympics.

References

1972 births
Living people
Japanese women's basketball players
Olympic basketball players of Japan
Basketball players at the 1996 Summer Olympics
Basketball players from Tokyo